Kafbikh (Persian: کفبیخ)is a kind of traditional Iranian sweet is made in Khorasan, specially in the city of Gonabad and Birjand. This is made for Yalda, the Iranian celebration of winter solstice.

Preparation
The sweet Kaf is based on the root of Acanthophyllum squarrosum the root should be cleaned and boiled at least three times and the boiled water be discarded until the water has a good smell and good taste.
 

During this ceremony, the root of the plant called "Chubak", or Bikh which is known as Acanthophyllum , is soaked in water and after several boils, they are shed in a large pot called "Tegar". Families and men, with a handful of thin pods of pomegranate trees, called the "batches"  shake of the liquid, for hours, to become rigid, and this should be done in a cool environment so that the liquid is foamed and then hardened to dry. Like Isfahan Gaz
The prepared Kaf shuld sweetened at the end by mixing the juice or sugar or honey , and after being decorated, the walnut and pistachio are taken to the guests. at the beginning before sweetening the kaf , a youngs are allowed to throwing it to each other and rubbing the kaf to face of each other adding happiness to the guests.

Another custom performed in certain parts of Iran and khorasan on the night of yalda (Chelleh) involves young engaged couples. The men send an edible arrangement containing seven kinds of fruits and a variety of gifts to their fiancees on this night. In some areas, the girl and her family return the favor by sending gifts back for the young man.

Gallery

See also

 Nowruz
 yalda
 Gonabad
 zibad
 Jesuite
 Konditorei
 Kuo Yuan Ye Museum of Cake and Pastry
 List of baked goods
 List of desserts
 List of food preparation utensils
 List of pastries
 Mold (cooking implement)
 Pan dulce (sweet bread)

References

Parssea magazine what is Kaf? Gonabadis traditional festivals by Dr Mohammad Ajam Gonapa magazine December 2016  
KafBikh in khorasan for Yalda 
South Khorasan traditions.Kaf
KafBikh in khorasan for Yalda Firdausi university

Further reading
 
 

Gustation
Festivals in Iran
Persian culture